is an adult Japanese visual novel developed by ALcot Honey Comb and published by ALcot for the PC. It was released on July 24, 2009.

Plot 
The hand of an Oni with a ring is found on the bed of a river. The police finds out that the hand belongs to a woman, missing for a month, and closes the case, but the husband can't believe that his wife was a monster and so he instructs the young detective Kouya Karasuma to investigate. While exploring the forest, the boy gets lost; it's already evening when he hears some voices and decides to ask for directions. He therefore ends on the edge of a pond where two girls are having a bath, but he faints due to fatigue. When he wakes up, he finds himself in a house: the two girls' mother tells him that, having seen them naked, he has to marry one of them, as required by the rules of Saginomiya family. Kouya asks for time to think, discovering that in the village there's a legend about the existence of an Oni and there are rumors that Saginomiya family is in some ways involved.

Characters 

A young detective, he has no parents and never felt the warmth of a family. For this reason, he decides to stay with Saginomiya family to experience it. He's very responsible, but sometimes thoughtless. He practice martial arts. He was born on 7 November.

The eldest of Saginomiya's sisters, she's a miko and has a great spiritual power. Strong and nice, she's very good in martial arts and loves baking. She has short dark hair. She was born on 5 March.

The youngest sister, she has a weak constitution. She's a miko like her sister and loves befriending. Unlike her sister Sunao, who's loved by all the inhabitants, she's treated harshly because she was born from Saginomiya patriarch's second wedding. Her father died when she was a child; she has long blonde hair, her hobby is collecting Japanese anime and she was born on 9 February. She carries a broom all the time.

A little pink-haired miko with cat ears and cat tail. She's a waitress at Saginomiya's, but she's not very good. Sometimes she's cruel. She is Akari's shikigami and can pass through walls. She was born on 20 January.

Kouya's childhood friend, she grew up with him at the orphanage and is a genius. She attended nursing in the USA and graduated when she was very young, but, as her university degree doesn't count in Japan, she has to take all the exams again. She loves chatting with friends and having baths. She was born on 5 May.

A mysterious miko, she lives alone in a hermitage to guard the cave where a demon is sealed. She was born on 15 June.

The second wife of Saginomiya's patriarch, she's Sunao's stepmother and Hiyori's mother. She has American origins, and is a gentle and a little bit naive woman. She's in good terms with both her daughters and treats them with no discriminations. She has long blonde hair in a braid. She was born on 6 September.

Saginomiya's guest, he's a writer and journalist arrived to the village for the festival, held every 1000 years. He wants to find out the secret of the village. He always wear sunglasses and was born on 10 February.

External links 
  
 

2009 video games
ALcot games
Detective video games
Eroge
Japan-exclusive video games
Romance video games
Shinto in fiction
Single-player video games
Video games developed in Japan
Visual novels
Windows games
Windows-only games